Sinacantán is an extinct Xincan language that was spoken in the region of Sinacantán in Santa Rosa Department, Guatemala. It is reported in Glottolog.

References

 Campbell, Lyle (1997). American Indian languages: The historical linguistics of Native America. New York: Oxford University Press. .

Xincan languages
Languages of Guatemala

Indigenous languages of the Americas